Rafael Baena González (born 7 November 1982) is a Spanish handball player.

He competed at the 2016 European Men's Handball Championship.

References

External links

1982 births
Living people
Spanish male handball players
Rhein-Neckar Löwen players
Handball-Bundesliga players
Expatriate handball players
Spanish expatriate sportspeople in Germany